Li Er (born 1966) is a Chinese novelist. He is best known for his novel Brother Yingwu which won the 10th Mao Dun Literature Prize (2019), one of the most prestigious literature prizes in China.  He is deputy editor-in-chief of Mangyuan magazine and director of the Research Department of the Chinese Modern Literature Museum. His works have been translated into English and German.

Biography
Li was born in Jiyuan, Henan, in 1966, the year the ten-year Cultural Revolution broke out. In 1983, he was accepted to East China Normal University, where he majored in Chinese language and literature. In 1987, the year he graduated from university, Li published his first short story Gospel in Guandong Literature. After university, he taught at Zhengzhou Normal University. In 1993, his novella The Tutor Is Dead, was published. In 2002, Coloratura was published by People's Literature Publishing House, which explores the fate of the individual in contemporary China and the problematic quest for "historical truth". It has been translated into English by Jeremy Tiang. In 2005, Coloratura was nominated for the 6th Mao Dun Literature Prize. His other novel, A Cherry on a Pomegranate Tree, was translated into German and attracted German Chancellor Angela Merkel's attention. When Merkel visited China in 2008, she gave it to Chinese Premier Wen Jiabao as a gift.

Personal life

During the process of writing Brother Yingfu, Li's mother became seriously ill just after Li had moved his family from Zhengzhou to Beijing. He and his younger brothers sought medical treatment for his mother in several major cities.

Works
 
 
 English translation:

Awards
 2003 Coloratura won the 1st Ding Jun Double Year Prize for Literature
 Coloratura won the 3rd Red River Literature Award
 A Cherry on a Pomegranate Tree won the 4th Red River Literature Award and 10th Zhuang Zhongwen Literature Award
 2019 Brother Yingwu won the 17th Chinese Literature Media Award
 2019 Brother Yingwu won the 10th Mao Dun Literature Prize
 2020 Served as final judge member of the 6th Yu Dafu Novel Award
2021 Elected as a member of the 10th National Committee of the Chinese Writers Association

References

1966 births
Living people
Writers from Jiyuan
East China Normal University alumni
Academic staff of the East China Normal University
People's Republic of China novelists
20th-century novelists
21st-century novelists
20th-century Chinese male writers
Mao Dun Literature Prize laureates
Chinese male novelists
Educators from Henan